The Hypocrites is a 1916 British silent drama film directed by George Loane Tucker and starring Elisabeth Risdon, Charles Rock and Cyril Raymond. It is also known by the alternative title The Morals of Weybury.

Plot
A squire tries to make his son deny he fathered a villager's child, and wed an heiress.

Cast
 Elisabeth Risdon as Rachel Neve 
 Charles Rock as Squire Wilmore 
 Cyril Raymond as Leonard Wilmore 
 Douglas Munro as Sir John Plugenet 
 Hayford Hobbs as Reverend Edgar Linnell 
 Barbara Everest as Helen Plugenet 
 Gerald Ames as Aubrey Viveash

References

Bibliography
 Goble, Alan. The Complete Index to Literary Sources in Film. Walter de Gruyter, 1999.

External links
 

1916 films
1916 drama films
British silent feature films
British drama films
Films directed by George Loane Tucker
British black-and-white films
Films shot at Twickenham Film Studios
1910s English-language films
1910s British films
Silent drama films